Brian P. Henesey (born December 10, 1969) is a former American football running back who played for the Arizona Cardinals of the National Football League (NFL). He played college football at Bucknell University.

College

Professional career
Henesey played three games with the Arizona Cardinals in 1994.

Personal life
Henesey married Caroline who played basketball at Bucknell. He has son named Brian and daughter Kate who plays soccer for Bucknell and Delaware.

References 

1969 births
Living people
Players of American football from Philadelphia
American football running backs
Bucknell Bison football players
Arizona Cardinals players